"To Hull and Back" is the fourth Christmas special episode of the BBC sitcom, Only Fools and Horses, first screened on 25 December 1985. It was the first feature-length edition of the show and also the first special not to feature or mention the holiday of Christmas itself in the episode. Parts of the special were shot on location in Amsterdam and unlike most other episodes was shot entirely on film and therefore not before a studio audience (making it laugh-track free). In the episode, the Trotters agree to smuggle diamonds from Amsterdam for Boycie.

Synopsis
As the Trotters are enjoying another evening at The Nag's Head, Boycie and his business partner Abdul ask Del Boy in for a secret meeting, with a proposal that he travels to Amsterdam to buy some diamonds and bring them back to England, without informing Customs and Excise. Realising that this is smuggling, Del declines the offer, but agrees when Boycie offers him £15,000 for his services.

The next morning, as they arrive at the market, Rodney is concerned that the diamond smuggling job is too dangerous, but Del assures him not to worry. Just then, Denzil shows up in his lorry, and informs Del that Corrine (Denzil's wife) made Denzil promise to keep his distance from Del. With all that said, Denzil drives off.

The Trotter Brothers quickly run off from the police after trying to sell watches that play 36 different national anthems, but they encounter local policeman DCI Roy Slater and his partner DC Terry Hoskins. At Sid's café, Slater tells Del and Rodney that he is investigating the case, and already knows that Boycie and Abdul are involved, but does not know who the courier is. Also, Slater mentions that he will be retiring from the police force after solving the case (though Hoskins earlier explained that Slater was being forced out due to his duplicitous personality). As Slater and Hoskins leave, Del phones Boycie and warns him that Slater is investigating them. Del and Boycie organise a meeting with Abdul in the trailer of Denzil's lorry in a car park.

Late that night, Del and Rodney arrive in the Trotter van at Denzil's lorry. With Rodney standing watch, Del enters the trailer and receives the diamond payment briefcase from Boycie to take with him to Amsterdam. Boycie and Abdul leave, and Slater arrives, having received a call from a nearby resident. Del prepares to exit until he sees Slater searching the area, and hides under a tarpaulin at the far end of the trailer. He is not seen, but Slater inadvertently locks him in the trailer, before Denzil arrives and drives off. Trying to rescue Del, Rodney sets off in pursuit, following Denzil to Hull. Back at the station, Slater orders that a watch be placed on Boycie and Abdul's movements, and discusses the possible courier with Hoskins, with Slater mentioning that the Trotters have not been seen for a few days. Despite rebuffing Hoskins' suggestion that the Trotters could be the couriers, Slater mentions that Del is more cunning than he lets on and would be capable of pulling off a heist.

On the Hull docks, Del decides that, rather than go through the airports, which Slater is patrolling, he and Rodney should sail to the Netherlands in a hired boat instead. "Experienced seaman" Albert arrives to captain the boat, although it later emerges that he spent most of his time with the Royal Navy in the boiler room and thus has no experience of navigation. Despite Albert's incompetence (and after receiving directions from an oil rig), they make it to Amsterdam, where they meet a Dutch diamond dealer named Hendrik Van Kleefe and conclude the transaction, despite the fact that Boycie's money is counterfeit. There is one tense moment for the Trotters when they appear to be chased by the police just after Del has left Van Kleefe; two uniformed officers and a plain clothes man standing there start running and the Trotters flee, only to find after a long chase that the plain clothes man is the criminal being pursued, and not the Trotters.

After getting lost in the North Sea again, the Trotters eventually find their way back to England by following the MV Norland, a ferry which goes from Zeebrugge to Hull. However, they initially followed it to Zeebrugge, and had to wait for it to turn around.

A few days later, upon returning home to Peckham and meeting with Boycie and Abdul at the Nag's Head, the group are cornered by Slater, who, as it turns out, had arranged the deal with Van Kleefe from the start. Slater makes a proposal: either they all go to prison, or he leaves with the diamonds and they walk away free; the Trotters and friends reluctantly accept the second option. Del vows to get revenge, but Slater mentions that he is moving far away from London when he retires, then leaves. With their mission failed, a despondent and fatigued Del, Rodney, and Albert head home.

Meanwhile, Hoskins drives Slater home whilst Slater speculates as to what happened to the diamonds. Hoskins turns into a side road and straight into a police sting. It then emerges that Slater's superiors have long suspected him of corruption, and set him up to be caught in possession of the diamonds, and Hoskins was ordered by the Commissioner to monitor Slater. Slater attempts to bribe his way out, but Hoskins refuses and reveals that he is wearing a wire. Meanwhile, Van Kleefe is apprehended by the Dutch authorities while he is attempting to deposit the counterfeit money at the bank.

Back at Nelson Mandela House, Del and Albert reveal to Rodney that there is some good news, because Del, having noticed that the diamond money was fake, had switched two of the diamonds for two of his cats' eye cufflinks and kept them hidden in Albert's pipe as a way of revenge. Rodney then reveals that it was he, and not Slater, who took the £15,000 during the stand-off at the pub. Del, believing that the £15,000 was also counterfeit (although it was, in fact, genuine), throws it over the balcony, leaving Rodney and Albert stunned, and Del feeling proud of himself.

Episode cast

Production 
"To Hull and Back" was one of only two episodes shot entirely with film, rather than using video. The other was the second part of "Miami Twice".

Notes 

 The title of the special is derived from the film To Hell and Back.

Music
Paul McCartney and Wings: "My Carnival"
Elton John: "Restless"
Paul McCartney: "Spies Like Us"
Wham!: "I'm Your Man"
Five Star: "R.S.V.P."
Bronski Beat: "Hit That Perfect Beat"
Pet Shop Boys: "West End Girls"
Leo Sayer: "Oh Wot a Life"

References

External links

1985 British television episodes
Television episodes set in Amsterdam
British Christmas television episodes
Kingston upon Hull
Only Fools and Horses special episodes